Black and White may refer to:

Black and white, a form of visual representation that does not use color

Film and television 
 Black and White (1913 film), an American silent comedy starring Harry Carey
 Black and White (1931 film), a French comedy starring Raimu and Fernandel
 Black and White (1932 film), a Soviet short animated film
 Black and White (1999 drama film), a drama directed by James Toback
 Black and White (1999 TV film), a thriller starring Gina Gershon
 Black and White (2002 film), an Australian film starring Robert Carlyle
 Black & White (2008 Hindi film), starring Anil Kapoor
 Black & White (2008 Telugu film), starring Rajeev Kanakala and Sindhu Tolani
 Black and White (2008 Italian film), a 2008 Italian romance film
 Black and White (2010 film), a Turkish film
 Black & White (TV series), a 2009 Taiwanese television series
 Black and White (audio drama), a 2012 audio drama based on Doctor Who
 The Black and White Minstrel Show, a British television series (1958–78)

Video games 
 Black & White (video game), by Lionhead Studios
 Black & White: Creature Isle a 2002 expansion pack
 Black & White 2, a 2005 sequel
 Black & White 2: Battle of the Gods, a 2006 expansion pack
 Pokémon Black and White, handheld video games for the Nintendo DS
Pokémon Black and White 2, handheld video games and sequels to Pokémon Black and White for the Nintendo DS

Publications 
 Black and White: Land, Labor, and Politics in the South, an 1884 book published in the U.S. by Timothy Thomas Fortune
 Black and White (magazine), a British illustrated weekly 1891–1912
 "" a 1925 Russian-language poem by Vladimir Vladimirovich Mayakovsky 
 Black & White (book), a 1980 book about the Jonestown Massacre by Shiva Naipaul
 Black and White (picture book), a 1990 children's picture book by David Macaulay
 Black+White, an Australian cultural magazine published from 1992 to 2007
 Black & White (Birmingham newspaper), an alternative biweekly newspaper published in Birmingham, Alabama from 1992 to 2013
 Black & White, a 2007 novel by Dani Shapiro
 Black and White (novel), a 2009 superhero novel by Kessler and Kittredge
 Black and White (newspaper), the Walt Whitman High School newspaper

Music

Songs 
 "Black and White" (Kylie Minogue song), 2015
 "Black and White" (Static-X song), 2001
 "Black and White" (Three Dog Night song) originally written by David I. Arkin, 1972
 "Black and White" (Niall Horan song), 2020
 "Black & White" (Natalie Duncan song)
 "Crno i belo" ("Black and White"), a 2012 song by Kaliopi
 "Black and White", by the dB's on the album Stands for Decibels
 "Black and White", by Deep Purple on the album The House of Blue Light
 "Black and White", by INXS on the album Shabooh Shoobah
 "Black and White", by Jackson Browne on the album Lives in the Balance
 "Black and White", by Loudness on the album Metal Mad
 "Black and White", by Sarah McLachlan on the album Surfacing
 "Black and White", by Screaming Jets on the album World Gone Crazy
 "Black and White", by The String Cheese Incident on the album Outside Inside
 "Black and White", by Todd Rundgren on the album Faithful
 "Black and White", by The Upper Room on the album Other People's Problems
 "Black & White", a 2006 song by AAA
 "Black & White", by In Flames on the album Reroute to Remain
 "Black & White (Juice Wrld song)", 2018
 "Black & White", by Todrick Hall featuring Superfruit from Straight Outta Oz (Deluxe Edition)
 "Black † White", the opening song for the anime Problem Children are Coming from Another World, Aren't They?, by Iori Nomizu

Albums 
 Black and White (BoDeans album), 1991
 Black & White (Colleen Hewett album), 2015
 Black and White: the Definitive Collection, 1996, a 20-track compilation of Ewan MacColl's work
 Black & White (Flow album), 2012
 Black & White (G.NA album), 2011
 The Black and White Album, an album by The Hives
 The Black & White Album, a 2007 album by Imani Coppola
 Black & White (Janie Frickie album), 1986
 Black & White (The Maine album), 2010
 Black & White (Pointer Sisters album), 1981
 Black & White (Royal Tailor album), 2011
 Black & White 050505, a 2005 album by Simple Minds
 Black and White (The Stranglers album), 1978
 Black and White (Tony Joe White album), 1969
 Black and White (Wretch 32 album), 2011
 Black and White (soundtrack), the soundtrack to the 1999 film
 Black and White (EP), a 2010 EP by Dimmi Argus
 Black & White, a 2011 album by John's Children

Record companies 
 Black & White Records, a jazz record label, progressive in the 1940s

Other uses 
 Black and White (ballet), a 1988 ballet by Peter Martins
 Black and white (police vehicle), an American slang term for a police car
 Black & White (whisky), a blended whisky
 Black & White Publishing, Scottish company
 Black and white cookie, a shortbread type
 Black–white binary, a paradigm in critical race theory
 Black-and-white dualism
 Black and white thinking
 Black and White Motorways Ltd,  a major British motor coach company from 1926 to 1976, when it was absorbed into the National Bus Company (UK)
 Black and white village, term for villages of a particular architectural style
 Black-and-white mannikin, a bird
 Black-and-white Revival architecture, the 19th century revival of vernacular architecture
 Black & White Festival, an annual audiovisual festival in Portugal
 Black and White Army, an alternative name for English Football League Championship team Newcastle United

See also 
 B&W (disambiguation)
 Black on white (disambiguation)
 Black or White (disambiguation)
 Black. White., a reality television show
 "Black/White" a 1985 song by Mr. Mister on the album Welcome to the Real World
 Blacks & Whites, a board game
 Blacks and Whites, Virginia, currently named Blackstone
 Black N White, a Jon Jones produced album
 A Black and White Night (disambiguation)